Double Seven is a studio album by The Upsetters.

Track listing
All tracks composed by Lee Perry; except where indicated

Side one
"Kentucky Skank"
"Double Six" – U Roy
"Just Enough" (Buddy Mize, Ira Allen) – David Isaacs
"In The Iaah"
"Jungle Lion"
"We Are Neighbours" (Eugene Record, Quinton Joseph) – David Isaacs

Side two
"Soul Man" (Isaac Hayes, David Porter)
"Stick Together" – U Roy
"High Fashion" – I-Roy
"Long Sentence"
"Hail Stones"
"Ironside"
"Cold Weather"
"Waap You Waa"

References 

The Upsetters albums
1974 albums
Trojan Records albums
Albums produced by Lee "Scratch" Perry